Simone Sherise Battle (June 17, 1989 – September 5, 2014) was an American singer, dancer and actress. She was a finalist on The X Factor in 2011 and a member of the girl group G.R.L. from 2012 until her death in 2014. The group was best known for their singles "Vacation", "Ugly Heart" and "Wild Wild Love" with Pitbull. Following her death, the group dedicated their single "Lighthouse" to Battle.

Outside of her music work, she  starred in several music videos and the film We the Party (2012) alongside Snoop Dogg.

Career

2006–2011: Career beginnings and The X Factor
Battle made her television debut in 2006, having small roles on shows including Zoey 101 and Everybody Hates Chris. In 2008, Battle was featured as the main character in the Mary Mary music video "Get Up". Battle also appeared as a background dancer in the Cali Swag District music video "Teach Me How to Dougie" in 2010.

In 2011, Battle auditioned for the American singing competition The X Factor in front of judges Simon Cowell, Paula Abdul, Cheryl and L.A. Reid. Battle sang "When I Grow Up" by The Pussycat Dolls. After receiving three yeses from the judges, Battle had made it through to Bootcamp. She was mentored by Cowell after becoming one of the Top 32 finalists in the girls category. Battle chose to be part of the live shows with Melanie Amaro, Rachel Crow, Drew, and Tiah Tolliver. After making it to the top 17, Battle and Tolliver were eliminated from the girls category during the first week by Cowell. He had also noted Battle as being one of his favorite contestants that he has mentored.
Battle's performances on The X Factor were:

2012–2014: Solo success, acting roles, and formation of G.R.L
In 2012, Battle starred opposite Mandela Van Peebles, Moisés Arias, and Snoop Dogg in her film debut We the Party. The film received mixed to positive reviews from critics. We the Party was Battle's first and final full-length film. In 2012, Battle played Olivia in the short film Meanamorphosis. The film was released on April 27, 2012.

Upon Steve Jones' announcement that she had been eliminated from the competition, Battle promoted the online release of her debut music video "He Likes Boys".

In August 2012, Battle was initially part of The Pussycat Dolls' proposed new lineup after their past members disbanded in 2010. Her addition to the group was announced during the opening of the Pussycat Dolls Dollhouse at the Keating Hotel in San Diego, California. Antin later announced in February 2013 that they would continue instead as the "next generation" of the Dolls as a group called G.R.L.

Death
Battle was found dead on September 5, 2014, at the age of 25. The cause of death was ruled as suicide. A spokesperson for Battle stated that she suffered from depression due to financial issues.

Tributes
Simone's death led to a wide amount of media coverage and responses from fellow entertainers, co-workers, fans, and friends on social media. Many of Battle's co-workers and fellow entertainers including Robin Antin, Nicole Scherzinger, Simon Cowell, Pitbull, Cirkut, Dr. Luke, Mel B, Cheryl, and fellow G.R.L. members Natasha Slayton, Emmalyn Estrada and Lauren Bennett paid tribute to Battle by writing about her on their social media. The hashtag #RIPSimone was commonly used in posts about her, which trended worldwide on Twitter, as well as "Simone Battle".

Musical tributes
Battle's  band G.R.L. released the single "Lighthouse" as a tribute to Battle. The music video features clips and photos of Battle throughout her life.

Discography

Battle released four singles and one music video as a solo artist and released one extended play, two singles (including one as a featured artist), two promotional singles, and three music videos with G.R.L.

Singles

Music videos

Covers

Filmography

Film

Television

Music videos

References

External links

1989 births
2014 deaths
20th-century African-American women singers
African-American actresses
The X Factor (American TV series) contestants
American film actresses
American television actresses
Actresses from Los Angeles
Female suicides
Singers from Los Angeles
Suicides by hanging in California
21st-century American actresses
Participants in American reality television series
21st-century American women singers
2014 suicides
G.R.L. members
21st-century African-American women singers